Dactylina is a genus of lichen-forming fungi in the family Parmeliaceae. The genus was circumscribed by Finnish botanist William Nylander in 1860, with Dactylina arctica assigned as the type species.

Species
Dactylina arctica 
Dactylina beringica 
Dactylina chinensis 
Dactylina muricata 
Dactylina ramulosa

References

Parmeliaceae
Lichen genera
Taxa described in 1860
Taxa named by William Nylander (botanist)
Lecanorales genera